Pigeon Creek is a stream in Texas and Dent counties of southern Missouri. It is a tributary of the Current River.

The stream was named for the common occurrence of pigeons along the stream.

References

Rivers of Dent County, Missouri
Rivers of Texas County, Missouri
Rivers of Missouri